A Wicked Offer is an American reality television series that aired on The CW. The show, hosted by Attorney Matthew J. O'Connor, premiered on Wednesday, August 5, 2015. It was a competition series in which couples completed tasks to earn cash prizes.

Episodes

References 

2010s American reality television series
2015 American television series debuts
2015 American television series endings
English-language television shows
The CW original programming